DiscoVision is the name of several things related to the video LaserDisc format.

It was the original name of the "Reflective Optical Videodisc System" format later known as "LaserVision" or LaserDisc.

Description
MCA DiscoVision, Inc. was a division of entertainment giant MCA (Music Corporation of America), established in 1969 to develop and sell an optical videodisc system. MCA released discs pressed in Carson and Costa Mesa, California on the DiscoVision label from the format's Atlanta, Georgia launch in 1978 to 1982 and the release of the film, The Four Seasons. DiscoVision titles included films from Universal Pictures, Paramount Pictures, Warner Bros. Pictures, and Disney content. Agreements were made with Columbia Pictures and United Artists, though no discs were released on the DiscoVision label from either studio. Most of these companies later established their own labels for the format, the first being Paramount with a dozen movies released on the Paramount Home Video label in the summer of 1981.

The successor to MCA DiscoVision, DiscoVision Associates (DVA) was the result of a partnership between IBM and MCA. It was hoped that the merger would provide the basis for improvement of the quality of DiscoVision pressings, but no appreciable improvement ever took hold. In 1981, responsibility for the laser videodisc was sold to Pioneer Electronic Corporation. Pioneer, in association with MCA, had a disc replication facility in Kofu, Japan that produced discs. Some of the last DiscoVision label discs were manufactured by Pioneer in Japan. In the same year, MCA had an abrupt failure from its DiscoVision system and was replaced by MCA Videodisc; this was changed to the "MCA Home Video" name for both its VHS and videodisc releases.

DiscoVision Associates later evolved into a patent holding company which manages and licenses intellectual property related to LaserDisc, Compact Disc, and optical disc technologies, as well as other non-disc related fields.

In 1989, Pioneer acquired DiscoVision Associates where it continues to license its technologies independently.

As the portfolio of patent expires, the presence of DiscoVision became less visible. However, it established the success of a patent holding company, which other companies are stimulated to generate royalty income from their own patent portfolio.

References

External links
 DiscoVision Library at Blam Entertainment Group

Video storage
Digital media
Film and video technology
Discontinued media formats
LaserDisc
Patent monetization companies of the United States